Sassparilla is a roots-rock, band from Portland, Oregon, also described as indie-roots, punk-Americana, and punk-roots.  They have received notable press coverage, including appearances on local ABC affiliate KATU on Oct 13 2012. Their fourth album, Magpie, was produced by Eels' Chet Lyster and released by Fluff and Gravy records.  The third album, The Darndest Thing, received acclaim by numerous independent reviewers outside of the Portland area.  Coverage includes a positive on Static Multimedia.  They have been reviewed in NEW YORK MUSIC DAILY as well as Celebrity Cafe.  Statewide coverage includes an article in the Eugene Weekly.  Their music is available through their website and can be heard on Pandora and iTunes.

The band's live performances are high energy affairs, "complete with dancing, sing-along numbers, and plenty of good times."  Through such high energy live performances, the band has developed a loyal following in the Pacific Northwest.  Their debut album Debilitated Constitution, released in 2007, has been described as "raw and edgy country-blues with ragtime traditions."

Discography
 Debilitated Constitution (2007)
 Rumpus (2008)
 Ramshackle (2010)
 The Darndest Thing (2011)
 Magpie (2013)
 Pasajero/Hullabaloo (2014)
 No Country, No Flag (2019)
 Good For What Ails Ya (2020)

External links

Notes

References

 
 
 
 
 
 
 
 
 
 
 

Musical groups from Portland, Oregon